The National Girls and Women in Sports Day (NGWSD) is an annual day of observance held during the first week of February to acknowledge the accomplishments of female athletes, recognize the influence of sports participation for women and girls, and honor the progress and continuing struggle for equality for women in sports.

Each year since its inception in 1987, the United States Congress recognizes women's contributions to sports and society on a day during the first week of February. NGWSD is celebrated annually across the United States and features community-based events, notable women athletes, awards, and other activities. The events are organized by members of the National Girls & Women in Sports Day Coalition, including the Women's Sports Foundation, National Women's Law Center, the President's Council on Fitness, Sports, and Nutrition, and Girls, Inc.

History

On February 3, 1987, President Ronald Reagan signed Proclamation 5606 declaring February 4, 1987, as National Women in Sports Day.

NGWSD was originally initiated in 1987 as a day to remember Olympic volleyball player Flo Hyman for her achievements and work for equality. Hyman died suddenly of Marfan's Syndrome, a genetic disorder of the connective tissue, in 1986 while competing in a volleyball tournament in Japan.  Since then, the day of observance has evolved to recognize all women athletes, their past and current sports achievements, the positive influence of sports participation for women, girls and society, as well as the progress made since Title IX was passed and the continuing struggle for equality and access for women in sports.

See also 

 Title IX
 Women's Sports Foundation
 Women's sport

Other holidays honoring women
 Susan B. Anthony Day (February 15)
 Rosa Parks Day (February 4 / December 1)
 International Women's Day, (March 8)
 Harriet Tubman Day (March 10)
 World Female Ranger Day (June 23)
 Helen Keller Day (June 27)
 Women's Equality Day (August 26)

References

Further reading 
 Blumenthal, Karen (2005), Let Me Play: The Story of Title IX: The Law That Changed the Future of Girls in America, Simon and Schuster, 
 Brake, Deborah (2010), Getting in the Game: Title IX and the Women's Sports Revolution, NYU Press, 
 Mitchell, Nicole; Ennis, Lisa A. (2007), Encyclopedia of Title IX and Sports, Greenwood Publishing Group, 
 O'Reilly, Jean; Cahn, Susan K. (2007), Women and Sports in the United States: A Documentary Reader, UPNE, 
 Woods, Ron (2015), Social Issues in Sport, Human Kinetics, .

External links 
 

1987 establishments in the United States
Recurring events established in 1987
February observances
Women's sports in the United States
Women's Sports Foundation